Introducing Johnny Griffin is the debut album by jazz tenor saxophonist Johnny Griffin, released by Blue Note in February 1957. It was recorded at the Van Gelder Studio in Hackensack on April 17, 1956.

Track listing 
 "Mil Dew" (Griffin) - 3:56
 "Chicago Calling" (Griffin) - 5:38
 "These Foolish Things" (Link, Marvell, Strachey) - 5:12
 "The Boy Next Door" (Martin, Blane) - 4:57
 "Nice and Easy" (Griffin) - 4:22
 "It's All Right with Me" (Cole Porter) - 5:02
 "Lover Man" (Davis, Ram Ramirez, Sherman) - 7:56

Bonus tracks on CD reissue:
"The Way You Look Tonight" (Dorothy Fields, Jerome Kern) - 6:23
 "Cherokee" (Ray Noble) - 4:17

Personnel 
Johnny Griffin - tenor sax 
Wynton Kelly - piano 
Curly Russell - bass
Max Roach - drums

References 

1957 debut albums
Johnny Griffin albums
Blue Note Records albums
Albums produced by Alfred Lion
Albums recorded at Van Gelder Studio